Vishnu Puran (also written Vishnupuran) is an Indian television series, by B. R. Chopra on the Hindu deity Vishnu. It is based on the Bhagavata Purana. Bhagavata Purana tells about the 10 incarnations of Vishnu, as well as other stories, such as the legend of Dhruva. The weekly series first aired Sunday morning, January 23, 2000 on Zee TV. The 124 episodes were later released on DD National.

The chief roles are played by Nitish Bharadwaj as Vishnu and Vaidehi as Lakshmi. Nitish Bharadwaj previously played the role of Krishna, in Chopra's television adaptation of the epic Mahabharat. The Story was narrated by Indrani Haldar in the role of Dharti Maa. The music is composed by Raj Kamal who also worked on Mahabharat. The title song was sung by Shankar Mahadevan and the songs decoding summary of each episode was sung by Mahendra Kapoor. During the COVID-19 pandemic in India, DD Bharati and Zee TV started re-airing episodes to entertain the public during the lockdown.

Episode guide

Vishnu is the protector of the universe (episode 1)
Episode 1: The narrator Mother Earth, Dharti Maa, introduces herself to the viewers. After the world ended in fire and flood, only the supreme God Vishnu was left alive. Brahma creates the world and the first humans, Manu and Shatrupa, who wander in the pristine nature and fall in love.

The story of Dhruva (episodes 2-6)
Episode 2: King Uttanpada, Manu and Shatarupa's son, becomes beguiled by his ambitious younger wife Suruchi and neglects his elder queen Suniti and her five-year-old son Dhruva. Suruchi throws Dhruva off his father's lap and Uttanpada fails to intervene. Suruchi tells the unhappy boy that no one but Lord Vishnu the supreme god can grant him the power to sit on his father's lap now.

Episode 3: Dhruva leaves the palace in search of Lord Vishnu. Goddess Lakshmi pleads with Lord Shri Vishnu to protect Dhruva, and takes matters into her own hands by manifesting as a snake to save the child from a gang of dacoits. Manu gives Uttanpada a talking to and Uttanpada and Suniti reconcile and search for their son. Sage Narada, sent by Vishnu, guides Dhruva to the forest and gives him a mantra to chant.

Episode 4: Goddess Parvati, at Goddess Lakshmi's request, protects Dhruva by sending her lion to guard the child from wild beasts. Dhruva asks Narada for further guidance and on his advice, gives up eating and drinking. Lord Vishnu tells Goddess Lakshmi, however, that he cannot come down to the world for just one person. Meanwhile, the king of the devas, Indra, fears Dhruva may ask Lord Vishnu for Indra's throne. Indra sends the apsara Rakshita disguised as Dhruva's mother, but Dhruva does not even notice her.

Episode 5: Uttanpada is miserable and Indra's attempts to frustrate Dhruva's penance fail. Dhruva begs Narada for further advice and, obeying his guru's instructions, stops breathing. The entire universe stands still. Now that just more than one person is affected, Vishnu appears before Dhruva.

Episode 6: Dhruva asks Lord Vishnu why his father didn't let him sit on his lap. Lord Shri Vishnu takes Dhruva on his own lap and heals his burns and hunger. Dhruva's questions disappear; he feels completely blissful. Lord Shri Vishnu instructs Dhruva to return to his people and be an example of an enlightened king. Dhruva returns home and forgives Suruchi, because if not for her he would never have found Lord Vishnu.

Matsya Avatara and the theft of the Vedas (episodes 7-9)
Episode 7: Dharti Ma narrates that sage Kashyapa had three wives, Diti, Aditi and Danu, the mothers of the daityas (demons), devas (gods) and danavas (monsters or giants or demons), respectively. Lord Vishnu entrusts the four scriptures, the Vedas, to Brahma, to be passed on to mankind. Hayagriva, a son of Danu, feels this is unfair to demons and determines to keep the Vedas away from humanity. Brahma is worried that mankind is too evil to receive the Vedas, and goes to consult Shiva about purifying the earth first. While Brahma is away, Hayagriva kidnaps the Vedas (who are in the form of four small boys) and imprisons them in his underwater lair.

Episode 8: Shiva agrees to flood the earth to destroy all evil life and purify it; Brahma can then create humanity anew and give them the Vedas. While Manu is bathing, a tiny fish swims into his hands and begs for protection. Manu takes it home, but it grows to giant size in a single night and he releases it into the ocean, where he realizes the fish is none other than Lord Vishnu. As Matsya, the fish, Lord Vishnu warns Manu of the coming flood and asks him to save anything important in a boat.

Episode 9: Hayagriva decides to destroy the Vedas but Matsya appears first and kills Hayagriva. Manu and Shatarupa gather plants and animals, deciding to save everything rather than having the pride to think they know what is valuable and what is not. At the last minute, Manu thinks of bringing the seven primordial sages, the Saptarishis. The deluge. Manu's boat is tossed by the storm but Matsya tows it to safety. After the flood, Lord Vishnu gives the Vedas again to the nine survivors.

Kurma Avatara and the churning of the ocean (episodes 10-17)
Episode 10: At Hayagriva's funeral, a danava named Kaalaketu defeats another danava, Arshal, for the kingship. The danavas at once attack the devas in revenge for Hayagriva's death, but Lord Indra easily defeats them. Lord Indra boasts about his victory.

Episode 11: Shukracharya, the danava guru, chides his followers for attacking without a plan. He forms a plan of his own: to ask Lord Shiva for the Sanjeevani Mantra - a mantra that enables one to bring the dead back to life. Lord Indra goes to Lord Shiva to prevent this, but Shukracharya attracts Lord Shiva's attention first and earns the right to attempt Shiva's penance to obtain the mantra: to hang upside down from a tree, without eating, drinking or speaking, and breathing only the smoke of burning leaves, for one year.

Episode 12: Lord Indra is worried when it appears that Shukracharya will succeed. When the apsaras are afraid to try and interrupt the penance, Lord Indra's daughter Jayanti determines to go, against Lord Indra's will.

Episode 13: Jayanti throws chili peppers into the leaf fire and Shukracharya is in agony. However, he does not break his penance. Angry at the sabotage, Shiva ends the trial and grants Shukracharya the Sanjeevani Mantra on the spot. Guilt-stricken, Jayanti offers to marry Shukracharya and serve him to atone for causing him such suffering. He accepts.

Episode 14: The danavas attack the devas and with Shukracharya bringing each dead danava back to life, the devas can't win. They flee and ask Lord Shri Vishnu to help them. Lord Shri Vishnu Bhagwan tells Lord Indra he must churn the ocean to extract amrita, the nectar of immortality. This will make the devas and danava even. The catch is, the devas are not strong enough alone to churn the ocean. Lord Indra must obtain the cooperation of the danava.

Episode 15: Lord Indra points out to Shukracharya that when he dies, he won't be able to use the Sanjeevani Mantra on himself and the danava advantage will be lost. Concerned, Shukracharya agrees to help churn the ocean. Both sides agree to share equally whatever they obtain from the ocean, but Shukracharya privately asks the danava Swarbhanu to make sure the danavas get the amrita. The churning rope will be the serpent Vasuki; Sage Narada tricks the danavas into getting the head end while the devas grasp the tail.

Episode 16: Lord Shri Vishnu incarnates as Kurma, the divine turtle, and supports the churn - Mount Mandara - on his back. The first thing to emerge from the ocean is a lethal poison. Lord Shiva drinks it to save the world, earning the nickname Nilkanth. Second, Goddess Lakshmi emerges from the ocean. The danavas and devas fight over her until Lord Brahma protects her and decrees the eternal right for a woman to choose her own husband.

Episode 17: Lord Brahma holds a Swayamvara ceremony for Goddess Lakshmi to choose her husband. She chooses Lord Shri Vishnu. The churning of the ocean continues and the amrita emerges and is promptly stolen by Swarbhanu. Lord Shri Vishnu appears as Mohini, a beautiful woman, and dazzles the danavas into inviting the devas to watch them drink the amrita. She gives it to the devas first, however, and there is none left for the danavas. Swarbhanu disguises himself as a deva and receives some amrita, but Lord Shri Vishnu then cuts off his head.

Narasimha Avatara and Prahlad's trials of faith (episodes 18-39)

Hiranyakashipu's boon (episodes 18-21)
Episode 18: Lord Brahma's four saintly sons visit Lord Shri Vishnu but are prevented from entering by the gatekeepers Jaya-Vijaya. The saints curse Jaya and Vijaya to be born three times as asuras and to be killed by Lord Shri Vishnu each time. Jaya and Vijaya are born as Hiranyaksha and Hiranyakashipu. Hiranyaksha steals the earth and hides it. Lord Shri Vishnu incarnates as Varaha and kills Hiranyaksha. Hiranyakashipu vows revenge.

Episode 19: To obtain his revenge, Hiranyakashipu does a penance to obtain a boon from Lord Brahma. Indra tries to help Lord Shri Vishnu by disrupting the penance, but every attempt is thwarted by Shukracharya. In desperation, Indra decides to kidnap Hiranyakashipu's wife Kayadhu  and kill her unborn son. However, Sage Narada stops Indra and rescues Kayadhu. In his ashram, Narada chants Lord Shri Vishnu's name to Kayadhu and her unborn son hears it.

Episode 20: Lord Brahma puts off answering Hiranyakashipu's prayers, but is finally forced to do so. Hiranyakashipu asks for immortality, but Lord Brahma says no being can have that. Hiranyakashipu must ask for something else. Hiranyakashipu asks Lord Brahma to make it that he, Hiranyakashipu, cannot be killed by day or by night, inside a building or outside a building, on earth or in heaven, by god or man or animal, or by any weapon. Lord Brahma grants all the boons. Narada tells Hiranyakashipu about the whereabouts of his wife.

Episode 21: Kayadhu says she has never been so happy and asks to stay with Narada until her son is born. Hiranyakashipu agrees and celebrates his boon by declaring himself God and banning the worship of Lord Shri Vishnu. Swarbhanu joins Hiranyakashipu's court. Kayadhu gives birth to a son, Prahlad, and receives permission to stay with Narada until Prahlad is a little older. Hiranyakashipu makes Narada promise not to say the name "Vishnu" in front of Prahlad.

Story of Prahlad (episodes 22-34)
Episode 22: Prahlad has grown into a sweet little boy who is utterly devoted to Lord Shri Vishnu (whom he knows by his 999 other names) and has mastered all the yoga Narada has taught him. Kayadhu and Prahlad return to the asura kingdom and Hiranyakashipu sends Prahlad to school. At school, Prahlad is shocked to see an idol of his father and refuses to worship it.  Prahlad teaches his classmates about Lord Shri Vishnu.

Episode 23: When Prahlad returns to the palace, Hiranyakashipu asks what he has learnt. Prahlad says the school taught false knowledge and Lord Shri Vishnu is the only God. Hiranyakashipu is furious and orders the teachers, Shukracharya's sons Amark and Shund, to correct Prahlad's thinking.

Episode 24: Kayadhu goes to the school and begs Prahlad to say that his father is the only God. Prahlad refuses. He is not afraid. When Prahlad returns to court and again affirms his faith, Hiranyakashipu orders Prahlad to be killed. But the soldier's swords do him no harm.  Hiranyakashipu sends Prahlad into exile in the wilderness instead. Swarbhanu follows Prahlad and prevents him from getting any food or drink.

Episode 25: Lord Shri Vishnu releases his Sudarshana Chakra and chases Swarbhanu away. Prahlad's fellow students find him and bring him food. Hiranyakashipu sends soldiers who throw Prahlad off a mountain. Lord Shri Vishnu catches Prahlad and lays him gently in a grain cart.

Episode 26: The grain cart was making a delivery to Hiranyakashipu's court. Furious at Prahlad's survival, Hiranyakashipu has his son thrown in jail. Swarbhanu attempts to poison Prahlad, but Shiva manifests and drinks the poison.

Episode 27: Hiranyakashipu's sister Singhika and her husband Viprachitti come for a visit. Singhika demonstrates how she cannot be hurt by fire, thanks to a boon granted to her by Agni the fire god. Hiranyakashipu enlists Singhika and Viprachitti's help in killing Prahlad. They suggest sending Prahlad to their kingdom, Kamarupa, with a letter. The letter will tell their son Aahlad to throw Prahlad into a snake pit. Aahlad tells Prahlad he will be taken to visit a temple of Lord Shri Vishnu.

Episode 28: Prahlad is locked in the snake pit, where he prays to Lord Shri Vishnu. Kayadhu also prays to Lord Shri Vishnu to protect her son. The Sudarshana Chakra appears in the snake pit and the snakes vanish. Prahlad opens his eyes and sees the idol of Lord Shri Vishnu. Meanwhile, an escaped snake bites Aahlad and he dies. Prahlad is devastated; he prays to Lord Shri Vishnu for his brother's life and Lord Shri Vishnu brings Aahlad back to life.

Episode 29: Hiranyakashipu, Singhika and Viprachitti hear of Aahlad's death and all vow revenge. Prahlad and Aahlad go to the palace together, but Singhika only pretends to be happy and persuades Prahlad to enter the fire with her. Aahlad becomes a Lord Shri Vishnu devotee. Hiranyakashipu declares a festival for the fire trial.

Episode 30:  Singhika and Prahlad enter the fire. Sinhika burns, Prahlad is protected. Viprachitti in revenge puts Prahlad in an enchanted sleep and throws him into the ocean, but the ocean god protects Prahlad at Goddess Lakshmi's behest. Kayadhu goes to the seashore and pleads with the ocean to return her son.

Episode 31:  Goddess Lakshmi asks the ocean god to return Prahlad to Kayadhu; he does so. Shukracharya offers to arrange for Prahlad's demise. He wants to invoke the demoness Kritya and orders his sons Shand and Amark to do so.

Episode 32:  Shand and Amark perform the Kritya ceremony. The demoness appears but the Sudarshana Chakra again protects Prahlad, so Kritya kills Shand and Amark instead. Shukracharya is devastated. Prahlad chides Shukracharya for being a bad guru and guiding his father Hiranyakashipu into the path of egotism. Prahlad selflessly prays for Lord Shri Vishnu to revive Shand and Amark and they become his disciples.

Episode 33: Hiranyakashipu decides to kill Prahlad himself. He orders his son to embrace a red hot pillar of iron. Brahma begs Lord Shri Vishnu to do something to overcome the boon. Lord Shri Vishnu appears as Narasimha with the torso of a man and head of a lion, who is both god and man and animal, and kills Hiranyakashipu at twilight, on the threshold of the palace, suspended in air on His thighs, with His bare hands and sharp claws. Brahma, Shiva, Narada and Goddess Lakshmi all fail to calm Narasimha down, but it is Prahlad who succeeds.

Episode 34: Prahlad performs his father's last rites after Aahlad refuses. Prahlad will not let Kayadhu commit sati. Goddess Lakshmi loves Prahlad, but Lord Shri Vishnu loves all his children, even the wicked ones such as Shukracharya.

Prahlad and Virochan (episodes 35-39)
Episode 35: Aahlad refuses the throne. Prahlad, now grown and king, dispenses justice. Shukracharya plans to control Prahlad’s son Virochan.

Episode 36: Shukracharya sends Virochan hunting, although Prahlad does not approve. During a storm, Virochan saves Sudhanva, son of Sage Angira, from a falling tree. Both are hurt and together they seek shelter at the cottage of Sage Vatsa. Both fall in love with the sage's daughter Deepavali.

Episode 37: Prahlad searches the forest and finds his son. Later, both Virochan and Sudhanva return to the hermitage and propose to Deepavali. When she cannot choose, Virochan draws his sword on Sudhanva and abducts Deepavali, taking her to Shukracharya's ashram.

Episode 38: The Saptarishis inform Prahlad of his sons' actions and Prahlad at once rescues Deepavali, standing up to Shukracharya. When neither Deepavali nor her father can decide between the two boys, her father asks Prahlad to make the decision.

Episode 39: Prahlad asks Sudhanva if he minds Prahlad being the judge. Sudhanva accepts. Kayadhu and Prahlad's wife try to convince Prahlad to decide in Virochan's favour, but Prahlad says Virochan was wrong to have used force and that he decides Deepavali should marry Sudhanva. Virochan humbly admits his wrongs. Lord Shri Vishnu and Goddess Lakshmi appear and praise Prahlad.

Vamana Avatara and Mahabali (episodes 40-46)
Episode 40: Kayadhu dies. Prahlad renounces the world and crowns Virochan. Virochan marries Vishalaakshi of the danavas. Shukracharya's father Sage Bhrigu foresees a danger to Virochan. Vishalaakshi gives birth to a son, Bali.

Episode 41: Virochan completes the penance for his safety suggested by Sage Bhrigu and receives from Surya, the sun god, a protective crown. Bali goes to school. Virochan announces that no gods other than Lord Shri Vishnu may be worshipped, angering Indra. Indra's anger worries Lord Shri Vishnu.

Episode 42: While Virochan is travelling alone, Indra tricks him, drugs him, steals his crown and kills him. Bali, now grown, vows revenge on Indra and attacks heaven alone - and is brutally killed by Indra and the devas. Lord Shri Vishnu is furious with Indra and after making him return Bali’s body, breaks his relationship with the Deva’s forever.

Episode 43: Shukracharya brings Bali back to life with the Sanjeevani mantra and requests that in return, Bali bring him Indra's crown. Bali attacks heaven, captures Indra and the other devas, bans their worship and exiles them to earth.

Episode 44: Aditi appeals to her sister Dhriti in vain for forgiveness for the devas. Lakshmi showers Bali with wealth after he worships her. When Bali hears that the devas are being worshipped on earth, he resolves to conquer earth; Shukracharya is thrilled. At Narada's request, Prahlad tries to convince Bali not to attack earth. Lakshmi also appeals to Bali in vain.

Episode 45: Bali invades earth. Aditi begs Lord Shri Vishnu to forgive her sons and fulfill his promise to be born from her womb. Lord Shri Vishnu incarnates as Vamana, a little person. Lord Brahma, Saraswati, Lord Shiva, Kashyap, Brihaspati and the devas attend the birth and bring gifts.

Episode 46: Lord Shri Vishnu explains to Indra that he has incarnated to be a beggar. Shukracharya tries to counter Lord Shri Vishnu's birth by ordering Bali to perform the Ashvamedha sacrifice. Vamana interrupts the yagna and asks Bali for three steps' worth of land. Bali grants the boon. Vamana grows and covers all three worlds in his steps, with the third one stepping on Bali's head and pushing him deep under the world.

Parashurama Avatara and the Kshatriyas (episodes 47-63)

Young Parshuram's determination (episodes 47-52)
Episode 47: Lord Shri Vishnu forgives and blesses Bali. A new story begins. The Brahmins (priests) were supreme in this age and the Kshatriyas (warriors) began to resent this. King Kartavirya Arjuna (Sahasrarjun) strikes Saint Jamdagni's son and is summoned to the sage's court.

Episode 48: The Brahmins make Sahasrarjun apologize. Embarrassed, Sahasrarjun gets together with other kings and forms a plan to steal Sage Jamdagni's cows and stop the state grants to the Brahmins. Lord Shri Vishnu promises Lakshmi that he will protect the weak.

Episode 49: The people provide for the Brahmins. The sages court accuse king Sahasrarjun of the theft of the cows. Angry, Sahasrarjun burns Sage Jamdagni's ashram.... over and over again. Lord Shri Vishnu is born as Parshuram, son of Saint Jamdagni and his wife Renuka.

Episode 50: Saint Jamdagni does not want young Parshuram to learn martial arts, as this is not appropriate for a Brahmin. But Parshuram practices anyway. Parshuram kills four soldiers who chase him into a Shiva temple.

Episode 51: Shiva appears and offers to teach Parshuram for ten years. Sahasrarjun turns on his allies and seizes their kingdoms. Parshuram renounces his caste and sets out for Mount Kailash, where Shiva accepts him as his pupil. Sahasrarjun meets Ravan, fights him, and takes him prisoner.

Episode 52: Sahasrarjun imprisons Ravan after discovering that Ravan can't be killed. Parshuram undergoes ten years of training. At the end, Shiva gifts him pianki bow and  an axe. Renuka goes to reason with Sahasrarjun and he traps her in the palace.

Sage Jamdagni's family troubles (episodes 53-57)
Episode 53: Renuka fights off Sahasrarjun, wounding and cursing him.  Sahasrarjun's wife wishes she was dead. Jamdagni accuses Renuka of being unfaithful. Renuka's four sons refuse their father's to kill their mother, but Parshuram, arriving home, promises to obey the order before knowing what it is.

Episode 54: Parshuram obeys his father and beheads Renuka. Jamdagni offers him any boon; Parshuram asks for Renuka to be restored to life. Jamdagni asks Renuka for forgiveness. Parshuram confronts Sahasrarjun but does not kill him after Sahasrarjun's wife asks for mercy. Sage Vashistha visits Jamdagni with the gift-giving cow, Sushila, and Anamika, her caregiver.

Episode 55: Sahasrarjun's army attacks the hermitage. Parshuram kills them all and Jamdagni tells him to leave. Sahasrarjun offers Ravan his freedom in exchange for defeating Parshuram; Ravan refuses. Shiva instructs Parshuram to free his devotee Ravan.

Episode 56: Parshuram frees Ravan. Sahasrarjun's army search for Parshurarm without success. Sage Jamdagni forbids the ashram students from joining Parshuram's guerilla army. Anamika offers to spread the word and recruit army members from other ashrams.

Episode 57: In order to be free to go out on her mission, Anamika lies and tells Jamdagni and Renuka that she has married Parshuram. Parshuram is angry. Sahasrarjun's four sons in disguise spy on the ashram and covet Sushila. When they try to take her by force, Jamdagni is finally roused and fights them off. Sage Jamdagni apologizes to Parshuram.

Parshuram's revenge (episodes 58-63)
Episode 58: Sahasrarjun attacks Sage Jamdagni, injuring him and stealing Sushila. Parshuram takes her back from the palace, but Sahasrarjun's sons reach the ashram first and kill Jamdagni. Sahasrarjun asks Sage Vishvamitra to take the Kshatriya side, and is sternly rejected.

Episode 59: Sahasrarjun's queen dies after failing to convince her husband to apologize and end the war. Twenty-one Kshatryia kings join Sahasrarjun; the Brahmins rally to Parshuram. Sahasrarjun's sons plot to kidnap Anamika. Parshuram gives his army a pep talk.

Episode 60: Sahasrarjun's sons attack Renuka and Anamika. Anamika kills herself rather than be used as a hostage. Sahasrarjun sends his sons away for their protection but Parshuram tracks down and kills them one by one.

Episode 61: Parshuram gives his mother Sahasrarjun's sons's heads. She dies unhappy that her son is so vengeful. Sahasrarjun swears vengeance for his sons.

Episode 62: Sahasrarjun tries to draw Parshuram into a trap. Parshuram offers peace in exchange for an apology from Sahasrarjun. Sahasrarjun refuses. Parshuram kills Sahasrarjun.

Episode 63: Parshuram visits Lord Shiva to return his bow. Shiva asks him to give to either Ravan or Janak - both are his devotees. Displeased by Ravan's behaviour, Parshuram leaves without giving him the bow. On the way he meets Shravankumar and his parents. Pleased by his reception at Janak's court, Parshuram gives the bow to Janak.

Rama Avatara and Ravana (episodes 64-120)

Ravana's atrocities, Shravan's death and Dasratha's marriage with Kaikeyi (episodes 64-67)
Episode 64:  Dasharatha accidentally kills Shravan while hunting and is cursed by Shravan's blind parents.

Episode 65: Dasharatha goes to help Kaipaya beat off an attack by Ravan. When his charioteer is killed, a young man takes the job. The young man turns out to be the king's daughter, Kaikeyi, in disguise.

Episode 66: Dasharatha defeats Ravan in battle. Kaikeyi saves Dasharatha's life twice, and he offers her two boons that she may have fulfilled any time in the future. Kaikeyi wants to marry Dasharatha and he asks his two queens if they agree.

Episode 67: Dasharatha's guru Sage Vashist arranges the marriage, which takes place. Meanwhile, Ravan continues to persecute sages and Lord Vishnu decides he must incarnate to stop Ravan.

Boons of Ravan & Birth of Ram and Sita (episodes 68-78)
Episode 68: Dasharatha asks Vashisht for help in performing a yagna (sacrifice) to obtain children. Ravan's hordes kill a sage and the blood falls in a field in Janak's kingdom. This causes a famine.

Episode 69: Sage Narada learns a lesson from Lord Shri Vishnu.

Episode 70: Ravan stops his youngest brother Vibhishan from worshipping.

Episode 71: On the advice of his younger brother Kumbhakarna, Ravan performs penance and asks for a boon.

Episode 72: Lord Shri Vishnu asks Goddess Lakshmi to incarnate with him.

Episode 73: Lord Shri Vishnu is born as Ram. Ravan prepares to attack the devas.

Episode 74: Ravan's son Meghnath defeats the devas. Laksmi is born as Sita and is found by Janak as he ploughs the field to stop the famine.

Episode 75: Manthara, Kaikeyi's servant, makes a failed attempt to kill the child Shri Ram. Ravan taunts the captive devas. Dasharatha asks Sage Vashist to undertake the education of his four sons, Ram, Lakshman, Bharat and Shatrughna.

Episode 76: Shri Ram asks Sage Vashista for instruction on religion. Janak invites Sage Gautam to be Sita's teacher.

Episode 77: Sita refuses to be taught by Gautam, because Gautam had unjustly turned his wife Ahalya to stone.

Ram wins Sita (episodes 78-86)
Episode 78: .The narrator, Dharti Ma, recaps Lord Shri Vishnu's incarnations so far.

Episode 79:The four brothers finish their education. Sage Vishwamitra's sacrifices are being disturbed by Taraka, a yaksha demoness

Episode 80:Dasharatha offers to send his army against Taraka, but Sage Vishwamitra asks for Ram alone. But Lakshman, who is inseparable from Ram, goes too.
 
Episode 81:Taraka attacks Ram with magic; he has to use celestial weapons to kill her and her sons Subahu and Marich.

Episode 82: Janak invites Sage Vishwamitra to Sita's swayamvara. Vishwamitra brings Ram and Lakshman along. Ram releases Ahalya from Gautam's curse.

Episode 83: Janak imposes a condition on the swayamvara; only those who can lift Shiva's bow will be eligible. Sage Vishvamitra decides to take Ram and Lakshman to the swayamvara.

Episode 84:Ram and Sita meet in a flower meadow and are smitten. Sita prays to Goddess Gauri. Gauri promises Sita that Ram will be her husband.

Episode 85: Ravan goes to the swayamvara and fails to lift the bow. Ram lifts it easily.

Episode 86:Parshuram is aware of the bow being moved and comes to confront Ram. He is appeased by Lakshman who explains Ram respects Lord Shiva. Wedding preparations begin.

The plot against Ram (episodes 87-97)

Episode 87: Keikeyi is thrilled about the wedding but Manthara is not. Sage Vishwamitra proposes that Sita's three sisters, Urmila, Mandavi and Shrutakirti marry Ram's three brothers, Lakshman, Bharat and Shatrughn respectively.

Episode 88: The quadruple wedding takes place and the couples return to Dasharatha's capital, Ayodhya.

Episode 89: Keikeyi is thrilled to see her son Bharat with his wife Mandavi. Manthara opposes Keikeyi's plan to gift her own jewellery to Sita. Dasharatha wants to retire and crown Ram king. Ram thinks Bharat would be a better choice.

Episode 90: Bharat is summoned to visit Keikeyi's parents, who are ill. The court decides Ram should be king.

Episode 91: Manthara tells Keikeyi that if Ram is crowned instead of Bharat, Keikeyi will be badly treated.

Episode 92: Manthara urges Keikeyi to use her two unfulfilled boons to prevent Ram's coronation.

Episode 93: Keikeyi asks Dasharath to fulfill her two boons by (1) crowning Bharat and (2) sending Ram into exile for 14 years.
Dasharatha is devastated.

Episode 94: Dasharath begs Ram to seize the crown anyway, but Ram says as a dutiful son he must help his father keep his promises. Ram asks Keikeyi to bless him.

Episode 95: Sita resolves to accompany Ram into exile. Queen Sumitra wants to persuade Keikeyi to take back her requests, but queen Kaushalya agrees that it is vital to keep a promise.

Episode 96: Lakshman also resolves to accompany Ram into exile. Ram, Sita and Lakshman change into renunciant's clothes.

Episode 97: Lakshman asks his wife Urmila to stay behind so that Lakshman can wholly devote himself to serving Ram. It is a sorrowful parting.

Ram goes into exile; Bharat's grief (episodes 98-106)
Episode 98: Dasharatha tries to convince Sita and Lakshman to stay behind. Ram promises Keikeyi that he will prevent anyone from rebelling against Bharat as king. Dasharatha never wants to see Keikeyi again.

Episode 99: Shri Ram leaves and meets a friend, Nishadraj Guha, who helps the three cross the river. Bharat and Shatraghun start for home from the palace of Keikeyi's parents. Dasharatha sends his prime minister Sumant to bring Ram back.

Episode 100: Shri Ram refuses Sumant's pleas to return. Lord Shiva explains Ram and Dasharatha's actions to Parvati.

Episode 101: Dasharatha dies of grief. Bharat and Shatrughan arrive home and are devastated to hear of their brothers' exile and their father's death. Bharat refuses the crown and decides to bring Ram back.

Episode 102: Bharat finds out his mother and Manthara engineered the whole plot and is devastated. At Sage Vashishth's request, Bharat conducts his father's funeral.

Episode 103: Devi Sita has a bad dream about Ayodhaya. Keikeyi feels guilty for Dasharatha's death. Sumant obeys Dasharatha's last wish and bars Keikeyi from the funeral.

Episode 104: Keikeyi mourns. Shri Ram, Devi Sita and Lakshman visit Sage Bhardwaj at Prayag, the confluence of the three sacred rivers: Ganges, Yamuna and Saraswati.

Episode 105: Bharat asks Keikeyi to come with him in search of Shri Ram. Devi Sita's father Janak hears all the news, including that Bharat has gone after Ram and taken the army. Janak heads after them.

Episode 106: Shri Ram, Devi Sita and Lakshman visit Sage Valmiki, who is writing Ram's life story, in Chitrakoot. Lakshman sees Bharat's army and fears at attack. Ram has perfect faith in Bharat's good intentions.

Episode 107: Bharat tells Shri Ram that Dasharatha has died. But Shri Ram insists on keeping his father's promise and refuses to return. Bharat promises to rule as regent only and takes Ram's sandals to place on the throne.

Episode 108: The demi-god vulture Jatayu directs Shri Ram to a dwelling place at Panchavati. Ravan's sister Surpanakha visits her brothers Khar, Dhushan and Trishira who live in a nearby forest. Ram kills some rakshasa demons when he finds them harassing some sages. Curious about this powerful human, Surpanakha visits Panchavati and is smitten with Ram.

Episode 109: A jealous Surpanakha attacks Devi Sita and an angry Lakshman cuts off Surpanakha's nose. Surpanakha returns with her brothers Khar, Dhushan and Trishira and Ram and Lakshman kill all three. Surpanakha tells Ravan who vows revenge and is furious and decides to attack Ram. Ravan asks the magical rakshasa Maricha, whom Ram saved earlier, to help.

Episode 110: Maricha turns into a golden deer and lures Ram far away, trying to catch it for Devi Sita. Maricha then calls for help and Sita, hearing, sends Lakshman. Devi Sita is now alone and Ravan abducts her, killing Jatayu. As Ravan flies through the air, Devi Sita throw down her jewellery.

Episode 111: At Ravan's island kingdom, Lanka, Devi Sita is kept prisoner by Trijata and other demons in a grove. Surpanakha is thrilled, but Ravan's mother and others warn Ravan this will cause trouble. Ram and Lakshman search for Devi Sita.

Episode 112: Ram blesses Shabari, an untouchable saint.

Episode 113:Sugreev, a prince of the Vanar kingdom, and Hanuman, a powerful vanar who is the son of the Wind God Vayu, find Devi Sita's jewellery and show it to Ram.

Episode 114: Sugreev tells his story: he left his brother king Bali who was fighting an asura in a cave, truly thinking that Bali was dead, and took the throne as regent until Bali's son Angad grew up. However, Bali was not dead, and returned angry, beating up Sugreev. Ram kills Bali for his wrong actions. A grateful Sugreev orders his army to find Devi Sita.

Episode 115:Angad, Hanuman and their friend the bear king Jambavantha meet Jatayu's brother Sampaati, who tells them Devi Sita is across the sea in Lanka. Hanuman leaps over the ocean and locates Devi Sita and be friends with Vibhishan. Ravan gives Devi Sita a deadline: marry him in one month or she will be forced.

Battle with Ravan (episodes 116-120)
Episode 116: Ravan's youngest son Akshaykumar attacks Hanuman and is killed. Meghnad takes Hanuman prisoner. Ravan sets Hanuman's tail on fire. Hanuman burns the city of Lanka to the ground.

Episode 117: Hanuman tells Ram about Ravan's deadline. Ram, Lakshman and Sugreev's army reach the seashore. Vibhishan advises Ravan to return Devi Sita, and Ravan throws Vibhishan out. Vibhishan joins Ram and tells him how to cross the sea. The monkey brothers Neel and Nal build a bridge Ram sends Angad as an ambassador to Ravan, in case there is a way to avert war.

Episode 118: Angad successfully stands up to Ravan but Ravan will not make peace. The war begins. Meghnad injures Lakshman with a celestial weapon and Hanuman fetches the Sanjeevani herb - along with the entire mountain that it's growing on - to cure Lakshman. Kumbhakarna advises Ravan to return Sita, but goes out to fight when Ravan refuses. Ram kills Kumbhakarna.

Episode 119: Lord Shiva tells the birth story of Hanuman to Goddess Parvati.

Episode 120: Meghnad prays to Lord Shiva for a boon, but does not receive it as Hanuman interrupts him. Lakshman kills Meghnad.
Ram treats Meghnad's body with honour and returns it to Lanka. Ravan and Shri Ram have their ultimate confrontation. Ram reveals he incarnated to stop Ravan's atrocities. Vibhishan tells Ram the secret of killing Ravan, who can regrow new heads - shoot his navel instead. Ram kills Ravan. The 14 years are up and Vibhishan, now king of Lanka, lends Shri Ram, Devi Sita and Lakshman his flying chariot so they can return to Ayodhya on the correct day and not worry Bharat. The exiles joyously return to Ayodhya and Bharat.

Krishna Avatara (episodes 121-124)
Episode 121: Mother Earth concludes that whenever she was riddled with sinners, whenever the human race was endangered - the creator of the Universe, the God incarnated Himself. She summarizes the 10 incarnation of Vishnu beginning with the incident of Jaya and Vijaya, who due to a curse were born twice as demons and became enemies of the God. and the God had incarnated Himself as Varaha, Narasimha and  Sri Rama to slay Hiranyaksha, Hiranyakashipu, Kumbhakarna and Ravana. In the form of Kansa, Kalanemi (son of Hiranyaksha) has spread terror in Mathura. The tyrant Kansa had fixed his sister Devaki's marriage with his friend Vasudeva. He is informed that God of death was waiting for this union as Devaki's eighth son will kill him through a heavenly voice. He imprisons his sister and brother-in-law so that he could kill their sons and prove the prediction wrong or false. Kansa kills Devaki's six sons, but Vasudeva's first wife Rohini took away their seventh son, who later came to be known as Balarama. Lord Krishna is born as the eighth son. Vasudeva shifts Krishna to Gokul to his friend Nanda overnight to save his child and switching their baby in Krishna's place. Kansa goes to prison to kill the baby and now the baby slips out of Kansa's hand and reveals herself as goddess Yogamaya, stating that it is useless to kill her as Vasudeva and Devaki's true child is safe in Gokula and says to Kansa that his end is inevitable. Kansa sends Demon queen Putana to kill Krishna. Child Krishna sucks out her life. Lord Krishna as child performs leelas with cowherd friends, one of many being Krishna dancing on the snake Kaliya. Kansa goes through repeated nightmares. Krishna kills Kansa's elephant Kuwaliyapeed. Krishna appears in various forms in Rangshala. One time Kansa's messenger Akroora (a righteous person) invites Krishna and Balarama for a duel with Kansa, where Krishna and Balarama kills Chanda and Mushtika respectively (Kamsa's bodyguards). Krishna kills Kansa after a prolong battle to free his parents from prison. Krishna recrowns Ugrasena (Kansa's father) as king of Mathura. During Yudhishthira's Rajasuya Yagna at Indraprastha, Shishupala started teasing the people over there, stating Krishna had married 16,100 women who already had a husband before, Bhima for marrying a rakshasi (demoness) Hidimbi, Bhishma for abducting the princess of Kashi and destroying a woman's (Amba) life and also he accused Pandu for killing a sage. Krishna is the one who got too much insults from Shishupala, and once his promise to his aunt (that he would not punish Shishupala until or otherwise he does 100 mistakes) was over, he spinned his Sudharshana Chakra to slice off (behead) Shishupala's head. Before all these incidents he also killed Dantavakra, Shishupala and Krishna's another cousin. Shishupala and Dantavakra were the last incarnation of Jaya and Vijaya (respectively) and they were freed from their curse when Krishna killed them.

Episode 122: Using the scenes from previous volumes, this episode summarizes Lord Vishnu's ten Incarnations. The first incarnation was as a fish to protect Manu and to punish the demon Hayagriva (not to be confused with Hayagriva god) who had stolen the four Vedas that Brahma had created for the welfare of mankind. Angered with the slaying of Hayagriva, demon Hiranyaksha kidnapped Mother Earth thus endangering the entire human race. This necessitated Vishnu's third incarnation as a Boar. He killed Hiranyaksha and rescued Mother Earth. The menace of demons was increasing specially after their Guru Shukracharya had gained the precious mantra from Shiva for giving new life to dead demons. To grant immortality to gods, it was decided to derive elixir by churning the ocean. To raise a mountain from the sea for churning, the Lord Vishnu took the incarnation of a Turtle.  To avenge the death of his brother, demon Hiranyakashipu gained a boon from Brahma which made his death almost impossible. He banned the devotion of Vishnu on earth and compelled people, including his son, to worship him. To end his atrocities Lord Vishnu made his son Prahlad as his ardent devotee. Hiranyakashipu used various methods to get his son killed. Lord Vishnu took the incarnation of Narasimha to destroy him. To end the arrogance of King Bali, Lord Vishnu took the Vaman Avtar - His fifth incarnation. When Kings began forgetting their duty as administrator and were closing down hermitages and schools then Lord Vishnu incarnated Himself as Parshuram and then the seventh incarnation as Rama. To relieve the world from the injustice of Kans and Kauravas Lord Vishnu took the eighth incarnation as Lord Krishna. And in recent times, when deception was at its zenith when the priests had spread the evils of superstitions in the society, the Lord Vishnu took the ninth incarnation - of Lord Gautama Buddha - to give a new direction of non-violence to the world. Whereas Balarama is worshiped in southern regions of India as the eight avatar, with Krishna as ninth, in distinction to north India, where Krishna is worshiped as eighth and Balaram is not included as an avatar. The present era is called Kali Yuga. In Srimad Bhagvadam the great Sage Vyasa has said that in the final phase of Kali Yuga, Lord Vishnu shall reincarnate Himself as Kalki. Thus concludes the sacred Vishnupuran.

Episode 123: This episode uses several important scenes from Dr. B.R. Chopra's Mahabharat TV serial to depict the importance of women in the Indian mythology. It deals with Rukmini's marriage to Krishna which highlights a woman's right to have a major say in the selection of her life partner. It also covers the story of Subhadra's abduction by Arjuna with the help of Lord Krishna.

Episode 124: This last episode also uses material from Mahabharat TV serial. It describes about the boon that was granted by Krishna to Shishupala and the death of Shishupala at Yudhishthira's Rajasuya Yagna at Indraprastha. It also shows the Bhagavad-Gita narration. Krishna drives Arjuna to the middle of the battlefield in his chariot. Arjuna sees the men on the battlefield and tells Krishna, "Winning a kingdom after killing one's own kin is too heavy a price to pay. I prefer to be a beggar if this is the price I have to pay for our throne." Krishna's teaching to Arjuna at the battlefield forms the basis of the Bhagavad Gita. Unable to satisfy Arjuna's hopeless conscience, Krishna grants divine eyesight to Arjuna and stuns him with his Viśvarūpa (divine manifestation). Arjuna is consoled and enlightened. He understands that the pure seek the spirit while the impure are trapped in Prakriti (Matter). He agrees to do his duty selflessly, lifts his Gandiva bow and prepares to fight the Kauravas.

Cast
 Nitish Bharadwaj as Bhagwan Vishnu / Ram / Krishna / Vamana / Parashurama
 Vaidehi Amrute as Devi Lakshmi
 Sudhir Dalvi as Bramhadev
 Samar Jai Singh as Bhagwan Shiva
 Indrani Haldar as Dharti Maa (Narrator)
 Sandeep Mohan as Devraj Indra
 Vikrant Chaturvedi as Devrishi Narada
 Nimai Bali as Jaya / Hiranyakashipu / Ravana
 Mahendra Ghule as Vijaya / Hiranyaksha / Kumbhakarna
 Sameer Dharmadhikari as  Manu
 Geeta Gore as Satrupa
 Jibraan Khan as Dhruv
 Daman Maan as Uttanpada
 Jaya Mathur as Suniti
 Deepshikha Nagpal as Suruchi
 Surendra Pal as Shukracharya
 Shameem as Jayanti
 Pradeep Sharma as Kashyapa
 Virendra Razdan as Bhrigu
 Deepak Jethi as Kaalketu
 Sanjeev Siddharth as Arshal
 Varsha Usgaonkar as Mohini
 Kinshuk Vaidya as Young Prahlad
 Mona Parekh as Kayadhu
 Yashodhan Rana as adult Prahlad / Meghnad
 Sunila Karambekar as Dhriti
 Jiten Lalwani as Virochana
 Ravi Kishan as Sudhanva
 Seema Pandey as Vishalakshi
 Siraj Mustafa Khan as Mahabali
  Arjun as Jamadagni
 Shalini Kapoor Sagar as Renuka
 Deep Dhillon as Kartavirya Arjuna (Sahasrarjuna)
 Adarsh Gautham as Janak Seerdhwaj
 Reena Kapoor as Sita
 Vindu Dara Singh as Hanuman
 Amit Pachori as Lakshman
 Vineeta Thakur as Urmila
 Ayush Pandey as Bharat
 Rishabh Shukla as Dasharatha
 Alka Kubal as Kaushalya
 Dolly Minhas as Kaikeyi
 Kamalika Guha Thakurta as Sumitra
 Tina Ghai as Manthara
 Shashi Sharma as Mandodari
 Vinod Kapoor as Vibhishana
 Ramna Wadhwan / Rajeeta Kochhar as Kaikesi
 Premchand Sharma as Vishalaksh
 Ambika Jk as Gopika
 Vishnu Sharma as Vashistha
 Bijay Anand as Young Meghnad
 Vilas Raj as Maricha
 Sagar Salunkhe /  Javed Khan as Vishwamitra
 Pradeep Saxena as Viprachitti

Reception 
Even though Vishnu Puran did not prove to be as successful as Mahabharat but it did become popular. Within a year, the series finished with the Vamana Avatara and The Hindu review said, "This lovely serial really overwhelmed us." By March 2001, it was consistently in Zee's top 10 ratings. By January 2003, it had completed 78 episodes with 100 more planned and was in the top 20 list. And for the week of July 13–19, 2003, it was in the top 5 for all homes, airing on Doordarshan National (DD1).

References

External links

Watch Full Show Of "Vishnu Puran" Now On YouTube.
Watch missing episodes 122, 123, and 124 on Dailymotion

DD National original programming
2000 Indian television series debuts
Television series based on the Ramayana
Television series based on Mahabharata